The 1916 Prime Minister's Resignation Honours were awards announced on 22 December 1916 to mark the exit of Prime Minister H. H. Asquith, who resigned in early December.

The recipients of honours are displayed here as they were styled before their new honour, and arranged by honour, with classes (Knight, Knight Grand Cross, etc.) and then divisions (Military, Civil, etc.) as appropriate.

Viscounts 
Lord Sandhurst  
Lord Cowdray
Right Hon. Lewis Harcourt

Barons 
The Right Hon. Joseph A. Pease  
Sir John A. Dewar 
Sir Thomas Roe 
Sir Edward Partington

Privy Councillor 

John W. Gulland 
Thomas Wiles 
Leif Jones

Baronet 
Right Hon. James H. Campbell   for Dublin University
John S. Ainsworth  Member for Argyllshire
James Hill    Member for Central Bradford
Sir Jesse Boot, Chairman of Boots Cash Chemists, knighted in 1909

Knight 

Arthur Carkeek, an Alderman of the Cornwall County Council and a large employer of labour. 
Hugh Fraser,  LL.D. Reader and Examiner in Common Law to the Inns of Court
William Gundry, member of the firm of Ashby, Morris, City Merchants
The Very Rev. John Herkless, D.D., Principal of St. Andrews University
Edward Smith, Chairman of the Standing Joint Committee of the Justees for London, Member of the L.C.C. and the County of London Appeal Tribunal
Evan Spicer, Alderman of the first London County Council and Chairman of the council in 1906-7

Order of the Bath

Knight Grand Cross of the Order of the Bath (GCB) 
Civil Division
The Right Hon. Sir Samuel Evans, President of the Probate, Divorce, and Admiralty Division.

Knight Commander of the Order of the Bath (KCB) 
Civil Division
Maurice Bonham-Carter, Private Secretary to Mr. Asquith

Commander of the Order of the Bath (CB) 
The Hon. Theophilus Russell   Diplomatic Secretary to the Secretary of State for Foreign Affairs

Order of St Michael and St George

Knight Commander of the Order of St Michael and St George (KCMG) 
Hon. Eric Drummond   Private secretary to Mr. Balfour, former private secretary to Mr. Asquith from 1912

References

1916 in British politics
December 1916 events
Prime Minister's Resignation Honours
1916 awards
H. H. Asquith